Tom Shaka (April 9, 1953, Middletown, Connecticut) is an American blues singer–songwriter.

In the 1970s he moved to Europe, and played in the Hamburg jazz club 'Onkel Pö', with musicians such as Udo Lindenberg, Louisiana Red, David Honeyboy Edwards, Abi Wallenstein and Al Jarreau. At the present time Shaka lives and works in the northwest German town Norderstedt, inside the Hamburg Metropolitan Region.

Discography

Albums
 Hot'N Spicey (1994)
 Hit from the Heart (1994)
 Timeless in Blues (1995)
 Blues Magic (1997)
 The Shaka Brothers: Blues Blood (2000, together with Bill Shaka)
 Keep on Keepin on (2002)
 Bless my Soul (2002)
 The very Best of Tom Shaka (2003)
 Deep Cut (2007)

References

External links

Janice-harrington.com
German-concerts.de
Crosscut.de

1953 births
Living people
American male singer-songwriters
American rhythm and blues musicians
American folk musicians
American folk singers
American blues singer-songwriters
Singer-songwriters from New York (state)
Singer-songwriters from Connecticut